John W. Liebenstein (December 28, 1845 – September 8, 1924) was an American businessman and politician.

Born in what is now Baden, Germany, Liebenstein emigrated with his parents to the United States, in 1847 and settled in what is now Milwaukee, Wisconsin. Eventually, Liebenstein settled in the town of Scott, Sheboygan County, Wisconsin. During the American Civil War, he enlisted in the 26th Wisconsin Volunteer Infantry Regiment and was a private. Liebenstein went to what is now Baldwin Wallace University in Berea, Ohio for two years. Liebenstein operated a sawmill and was in the insurance business. Liebenstein served as chairman of the Scott Town Board. He also served on the school board. Liebenstein served on the Sheboygan County Board of Supervisors. In 1893, Liebenstein served in the Wisconsin State Assembly and was a Democrat. Liebenstein died at his home in Batavia, Wisconsin.

Notes

1845 births
1924 deaths
People from Baden
People from Scott, Sheboygan County, Wisconsin
People of Wisconsin in the American Civil War
Union Army soldiers
Baldwin Wallace University alumni
Businesspeople from Wisconsin
Politicians from Milwaukee
County supervisors in Wisconsin
Mayors of places in Wisconsin
School board members in Wisconsin
Democratic Party members of the Wisconsin State Assembly